The Apostolic Vicariate of Rundu  is a Roman Catholic apostolic vicariate in Namibia (southwestern Africa). Its cathedral episcopal see is St. Mary's in the city of Rundu.

Although a missionary pre-diocesan jurisdiction, it is not exempt but a suffragan in the Ecclesiastical province of the Metropolitan Archdiocese of Windhoek.

History 
 Established on March 14, 1994 as Apostolic Vicariate of Rundu, on territory split off from the then Apostolic Vicariate of Windhoek (now its Metropolitan).

Episcopal ordinaries
(missionary members of Roman rite congregations)
 Apostolic Vicars of Rundu 
 Joseph Shipandeni Shikongo, Missionary Oblates of Mary Immaculate (O.M.I.), Titular Bishop of Capra (March 14, 1994 – present)

References

External links
 GCatholic.org with incumbent biography links
 Catholic Hierarchy 
 Vicariate website

Apostolic vicariates
Roman Catholic dioceses in Namibia
Roman Catholic dioceses and prelatures established in the 20th century
Christian organizations established in 1994
1994 establishments in Namibia
Rundu
Roman Catholic Ecclesiastical Province of Windhoek